This is a list of the fulmarine petrels, one of four types of Procellariidae.

Macronectes
 Macronectes halli, northern giant petrel, located in the southern oceans, north of the Antarctic convergence
 Macronectes giganteus, southern giant petrel, located in the southern oceans, and southern polar region south to the pack ice

Fulmarus
 Fulmarus glacialis, northern fulmar, breeds in the North Atlantic, along the coast of eastern Siberia, and the Alaskan Peninsula. Ranges through the North Atlantic Ocean and the North Pacific Ocean,
 Fulmarus glacialis glacialis breeds in the high Arctic region of the North Atlantic
 Fulmarus glacialis auduboni breeds in the low Arctic and boreal Arctic of the North Atlantic
 Fulmarus glacialis rodgersii breeds along the coast of eastern Siberia and the Alaskan Peninsula
 Fulmarus glacialoides, southern fulmar, located in the southern polar region; South Atlantic Ocean and the South Pacific Ocean

Thalassoica
 Thalassoica antarctica, Antarctic petrel, breeds along the Antarctic coast and on the Antarctic islands. Ranges through the southern polar region

Daption
 Daption capense, Cape petrel, breeds on the circumpolar and New Zealand subantarctic islands, ranges throughout the southern polar region, and coastal waters off the west coast of South America
 Daption capense capense breeds on the circumpolar subantarctic islands, ranges throughout the southern oceans
 Daption capense australe breeds on the New Zealand subantarctic islands, ranges throughout the southern oceans

Pagodroma
 Pagodroma nivea, snow petrel, located in the southern polar region
 Pagodroma nivea nivea, breeds on the South Georgia Islands and adjacent islands, Scotia Arc, and the Antarctic Peninsula
 Pagodroma nivea confusa, breeds on the South Sandwich Islands and the Géologie Archipelago

Lists of birds
Procellariidae
Fulmarine petrels